Abu Asad Mohammed Obaidul Ghani (1903–1973), also referred to as A.M.O. Ghani, was an Indian politician, belonging to the Communist Party of India.

Youth
Obaidul Ghani's grandfather, Maulvi Elahad, had moved from Darbhanga, Bihar to Calcutta in the mid-19th century. After obtaining his M.B.B.S. degree he founded the Park Circus charitable dispensary in 1950, serving the poor and lower middle-class populations of the city. Obaidul Ghani contested the 1952 West Bengal Legislative Assembly election as an independent, standing in the Baniapukur Ballygung constituency. He obtained 524 votes (0.88%).

Legislator
Obaidul Ghani represented the Entally constituency in the West Bengal Legislative Assembly 1957–1971, standing as a CPI candidate in the 1957, 1962, 1967 and 1969 elections. As a politician, he obtained significant popularity for his provision of medical services to the poor people of Calcutta. He stayed with CPI in the 1964 split. In August 1969 the Modern Furnishers Mazdoor Union was registered, with Obaidul Ghani as its president. The union was affiliated to the All India Trade Union Congress.

He lost the Entally seat to Mohammed Nizamuddin of the Communist Party of India (Marxist) in the 1971 West Bengal Legislative Assembly election. He managed to defeat Mohammed Nizamuddin in the 1972 West Bengal Legislative Assembly election and regained the Entally seat.

Death and legacy
Obaidul Ghani died following an attack of coronary thrombosis on 24 September 1973. After Obaidul Ghani's death, a by-election was held for the Entally seat on 3 June 1974. The by-poll was won by Sachindra Kumar Dhar.

There is a road named "Dr. A.M.O. Ghani Road" in Ward 64 of Kolkata. Obaidul Ghani used to live on this road, which was previously known as 'Pearl Road'. The new name was issued on 1 April 1974. There is also a "Dr. A.M.O. Gani Memorial Primary School" and a "Dr. A.M.O. Gani Memorial Girls School" in Ballygunge.

References

1903 births
1973 deaths
Communist Party of India politicians from West Bengal
West Bengal MLAs 1957–1962
West Bengal MLAs 1962–1967
West Bengal MLAs 1967–1969
West Bengal MLAs 1969–1971
West Bengal MLAs 1972–1977
20th-century Indian medical doctors
Politicians from Kolkata
Medical doctors from Kolkata